Kariya, Aichi is a city in central Aichi Prefecture, Japan.

Kariya may also refer to:

Films
 Kariya (film), a Kannada language film, released in 2003

People
 Martin Kariya (born 1981), ice hockey player
 Paul Kariya (born 1974), retired ice hockey player
 Steve Kariya (born 1977), ice hockey player
 Kariya Jin, a character in the Japanese anime series Bleach
 Kariya Kagetoki, a fictional elite samurai featured in the Japanese anime Samurai Champloo

Tribes
 Kariya or Sabar (people), an indigenous tribe in Musabani, Jharkhand state, India